Michael Lageder (born 24 April 1991) is an Austrian footballer who plays for Vorwärts Steyr.

Club career
On 11 June 2021, he returned to Vorwärts Steyr.

References

External links
 
 

1991 births
Living people
Austrian footballers
Association football defenders
LASK players
FC Juniors OÖ players
SK Vorwärts Steyr players
SC Austria Lustenau players
2. Liga (Austria) players
Austrian Regionalliga players